Neilson and Company was a locomotive manufacturer in Glasgow, Scotland.

The company was started in 1836 at McAlpine Street by Walter Neilson and James Mitchell to manufacture marine and stationary engines. In 1837 the firm moved to Hyde Park Street and was known as Kerr, Mitchell and Neilson and, in 1840,  Kerr, Neilson and Company, becoming Neilson and Mitchell in 1843.

Locomotive building began in 1843 for the local railways. In 1855 production of marine and stationary engines discontinued and the company changed its name again to Neilson and Company.
Among those who later became notable in the field were Henry Dübs and Patrick Stirling.

By 1861, business had increased to such an extent, that a new works was built at Springburn, also named "Hyde Park Works." In 1864, Henry Dübs set up in business on his own at Queens Park Works, as Dübs and Company, taking a number of key staff with him. James Reid, who had previously worked for Neilson, however, returned and became a partner.

Stationary Engines
When the Edinburgh and Glasgow Railway was opened in 1842, it used a pair of Neilson & Mitchell beam engines to work the rope incline from Glasgow to Cowlairs station. The engines were covered by an article illustrated with drawings in The Practical Mechanic and Engineer's Magazine in Jan 1844. They were beam engines mounted on an entablature supported on fluted columns. The engines had 28 inch cylinders, and 6 foot stroke. They were supplied with steam at 50psi by 8 boilers, each 30 foot long and 5 foot diameter.

Locomotives

By 1855, the company was building four-coupled tank engines, along with 2-4-0 and 0-4-2 tender locos. Some of these were for Cowlairs and St. Rollox, but many more went to India.

Through the 1870s considerable numbers of 0-4-4 tank engines were built for the London, Chatham and Dover Railway, the Midland and the Great Eastern. Many other types were built for railways at home and abroad, including fifty 0-4-2s for India. The company's first eight-coupled locos were built in 1872, also for India.

In 1879 the first 2-6-0s to run on British rails were built for William Adams of the Great Eastern. One of these was named "Mogul" and this became the name applied to all locomotives of this wheel arrangement. (However, the name had already been employed in the USA about ten years earlier.)

More overseas orders followed, with engines for South Africa and South America. The Engineer journal in 1883 carried a photograph of a Neilson 4-6-0 with Joy valve gear produced for the Cape Government Railways.

Turn of the 20th century
In 1884, Neilson left to form a new company, the Clyde Locomotive Company; although Reid became the sole owner of Neilson & Co., it was not until 1898 that the company changed its name to Neilson, Reid and Company.

However, by this time, intense competition from United States meant that small companies were unable to survive. There was a need for amalgamation, and in 1903 Neilson Reid combined with Dübs and Company and Sharp Stewart and Company to form the North British Locomotive Company, the largest locomotive company in the world outside the United States.

Preserved Neilson engines

Argentina 
• 0-6-0 No. 27 (works number unknown) of 1890, preserved at the General Urquiza Railway

Australia
 The Workshops, Ipswich 0-4-2 No 1170 of 1865 Queensland A10 Neilson class locomotive
 The Workshops, Ipswich 0-4-2 No 1214 of 1866 Queensland A10 Neilson class locomotive
 Rail Heritage WA 0-6-0T No 3631 of 1888  WAGR H class

Finland
 Finnish Railway Museum at Hyvinkaa 0-6-0 Finnish Steam Locomotive Class C1 No 1427 of 1869

Ireland
 GNR(I) Q class 4-4-0 No. 131 (works number 5727) of 1901, preserved at Railway Preservation Society of Ireland

New Zealand
 Ferrymead Railway – "Peveril" No. 1692 of 1872 (F13)
 Silver Stream Railway – No. 1847 of 1874 (D143)
 Pleasant Point Railway – No. 2306 of 1878 (D16)
 Helensville Railway Station – No. 2563 of 1880 (D170)
 Ocean Beach Railway – No. 2564 of 1880 (D6)
 Kaitaia Township – No. 2565 of 1880 (D221)
 Bush Tramway Club – No. 3751 of 1888 (F216)

Neilson and Company supplied the first (F13 of 1872) and last (F216 of 1888) members of the 88-strong New Zealand Railways F class. Six builders supplied F class engines between the arrivals of F13 and F216.

United Kingdom

 0-4-0ST  (works number 386) of 1869, preserved at the Museum of Science and Industry (Manchester) 
 GER Class 209 0-4-0ST No. 229 (works number 2119) of 1876, in store at The Flour Mill, Gloucestershire
 0-4-0ST (works number 2203) of 1876, preserved at the Scottish Railway Preservation Society
 0-4-0ST (works number 2937) of 1882, preserved at Chasewater Railway
 Beckton Gas Works 0-4-0WT No. 1 (works number 4444) of 1892, awaiting sale at Preston Services, Kent
 LSWR 415 class 4-4-2T No. 488 (works number 3209) of 1885, preserved at the Bluebell Railway
 Beckton Gas Works 0-4-0ST No. 25 (works number 5087) of 1896, preserved at Bressingham Steam and Gardens
 Taff Vale Railway O2 class 0-6-2T No. 85 of 1899, preserved on the Keighley and Worth Valley Railway
 Caledonian Railway Single 4-2-2 No. 123 of 1886, preserved at the Riverside Museum

Fiction
A character in The Railway Series by the Rev. W. Awdry is based on a Neilson prototype. Neil is a 'box tank' locomotive, who worked on the Sodor & Mainland Railway between 1856 and 1901.

See also
 Finnish Railway Museum
 :Category:Neilson locomotives

References

 Lowe, J.W., (1989) British Steam Locomotive Builders, Guild Publishing

External links

Finnish Railway Museum
Steam Locomotives in Finland Including the Finnish Railway Museum

British companies established in 1836
Locomotive manufacturers of the United Kingdom
Manufacturing companies based in Glasgow
Neilson family
1836 establishments in Scotland
Springburn
Manufacturing companies established in 1836
Vehicle manufacturing companies disestablished in 1903
British companies disestablished in 1903
1903 disestablishments in Scotland